Inguromorpha roseobrunnea is a moth in the family Cossidae. It was described by Paul Dognin in 1917. It is found in French Guiana.

References

Natural History Museum Lepidoptera generic names catalog

Hypoptinae
Moths described in 1917